The 2003–04 San Jose Sharks season was the franchise's 13th in the NHL. The Sharks made it to the Western Conference Finals for the first time before losing to the Calgary Flames. It was the last season before the 2004–05 lockout, which cancelled the following season.

Off-season
On May 13, 2003, the Sharks hired Doug Wilson (no relation to coach Ron Wilson) as general manager, replacing Dean Lombardi. At the Entry Draft in June, the Sharks chose Milan Michalek with their first-round pick, sixth overall.

Regular season
The Sharks rotated team captaincy every ten games for the first half of the season before permanently handing the role to forward Patrick Marleau.

Final standings

Playoffs

Schedule and results

Regular season

|- align="center" bgcolor="#FFBBBB"
|1||L||October 9, 2003||2–5 || align="left"| @ Edmonton Oilers (2003–04) ||0–1–0–0 || 
|- align="center" bgcolor="#FFBBBB"
|2||L||October 11, 2003||2–3 || align="left"| @ Calgary Flames (2003–04) ||0–2–0–0 || 
|- align="center" bgcolor="#CCFFCC" 
|3||W||October 12, 2003||3–2 || align="left"| @ Minnesota Wild (2003–04) ||1–2–0–0 || 
|- align="center" 
|4||T||October 16, 2003||0–0 OT|| align="left"|  Philadelphia Flyers (2003–04) ||1–2–1–0 || 
|- align="center" bgcolor="#FFBBBB"
|5||L||October 18, 2003||1–4 || align="left"|  Ottawa Senators (2003–04) ||1–3–1–0 || 
|- align="center" bgcolor="#FFBBBB"
|6||L||October 21, 2003||0–2 || align="left"|  Mighty Ducks of Anaheim (2003–04) ||1–4–1–0 || 
|- align="center" 
|7||T||October 23, 2003||3–3 OT|| align="left"|  Chicago Blackhawks (2003–04) ||1–4–2–0 || 
|- align="center" 
|8||T||October 25, 2003||4–4 OT|| align="left"|  Phoenix Coyotes (2003–04) ||1–4–3–0 || 
|- align="center" bgcolor="#FFBBBB"
|9||L||October 28, 2003||0–3 || align="left"| @ Carolina Hurricanes (2003–04) ||1–5–3–0 || 
|- align="center" 
|10||T||October 30, 2003||2–2 OT|| align="left"| @ Tampa Bay Lightning (2003–04) ||1–5–4–0 || 
|-

|- align="center" bgcolor="#CCFFCC" 
|11||W||November 1, 2003||6–2 || align="left"| @ Florida Panthers (2003–04) ||2–5–4–0 || 
|- align="center" 
|12||T||November 2, 2003||2–2 OT|| align="left"| @ Atlanta Thrashers (2003–04) ||2–5–5–0 || 
|- align="center" bgcolor="#FF6F6F"
|13||OTL||November 5, 2003||2–3 OT|| align="left"| @ New Jersey Devils (2003–04) ||2–5–5–1 || 
|- align="center" 
|14||T||November 6, 2003||5–5 OT|| align="left"| @ Boston Bruins (2003–04) ||2–5–6–1 || 
|- align="center" bgcolor="#CCFFCC" 
|15||W||November 8, 2003||3–2 || align="left"| @ Washington Capitals (2003–04) ||3–5–6–1 || 
|- align="center" bgcolor="#FFBBBB"
|16||L||November 11, 2003||3–4 || align="left"|  Colorado Avalanche (2003–04) ||3–6–6–1 || 
|- align="center" bgcolor="#FF6F6F"
|17||OTL||November 13, 2003||3–4 OT|| align="left"|  St. Louis Blues (2003–04) ||3–6–6–2 || 
|- align="center" 
|18||T||November 15, 2003||2–2 OT|| align="left"|  Toronto Maple Leafs (2003–04) ||3–6–7–2 || 
|- align="center" 
|19||T||November 18, 2003||2–2 OT|| align="left"|  New York Rangers (2003–04) ||3–6–8–2 || 
|- align="center" bgcolor="#CCFFCC" 
|20||W||November 21, 2003||5–0 || align="left"| @ Phoenix Coyotes (2003–04) ||4–6–8–2 || 
|- align="center" bgcolor="#CCFFCC" 
|21||W||November 22, 2003||3–1 || align="left"|  Nashville Predators (2003–04) ||5–6–8–2 || 
|- align="center" bgcolor="#CCFFCC" 
|22||W||November 26, 2003||3–2 || align="left"|  Chicago Blackhawks (2003–04) ||6–6–8–2 || 
|- align="center" bgcolor="#CCFFCC" 
|23||W||November 28, 2003||2–1 || align="left"| @ Minnesota Wild (2003–04) ||7–6–8–2 || 
|- align="center" bgcolor="#CCFFCC" 
|24||W||November 30, 2003||2–1 || align="left"| @ Edmonton Oilers (2003–04) ||8–6–8–2 || 
|-

|- align="center" bgcolor="#FFBBBB"
|25||L||December 2, 2003||1–3 || align="left"| @ Calgary Flames (2003–04) ||8–7–8–2 || 
|- align="center" 
|26||T||December 4, 2003||2–2 OT|| align="left"|  Colorado Avalanche (2003–04) ||8–7–9–2 || 
|- align="center" bgcolor="#CCFFCC" 
|27||W||December 6, 2003||2–1 || align="left"|  Dallas Stars (2003–04) ||9–7–9–2 || 
|- align="center" bgcolor="#FFBBBB"
|28||L||December 10, 2003||2–3 || align="left"| @ Mighty Ducks of Anaheim (2003–04) ||9–8–9–2 || 
|- align="center" 
|29||T||December 11, 2003||2–2 OT|| align="left"|  Edmonton Oilers (2003–04) ||9–8–10–2 || 
|- align="center" bgcolor="#CCFFCC" 
|30||W||December 13, 2003||2–0 || align="left"|  Mighty Ducks of Anaheim (2003–04) ||10–8–10–2 || 
|- align="center" bgcolor="#FF6F6F"
|31||OTL||December 17, 2003||2–3 OT|| align="left"| @ Detroit Red Wings (2003–04) ||10–8–10–3 || 
|- align="center" bgcolor="#FFBBBB"
|32||L||December 18, 2003||2–4 || align="left"| @ St. Louis Blues (2003–04) ||10–9–10–3 || 
|- align="center" bgcolor="#CCFFCC" 
|33||W||December 21, 2003||2–1 || align="left"| @ Mighty Ducks of Anaheim (2003–04) ||11–9–10–3 || 
|- align="center" bgcolor="#CCFFCC" 
|34||W||December 22, 2003||2–1 || align="left"|  Mighty Ducks of Anaheim (2003–04) ||12–9–10–3 || 
|- align="center" bgcolor="#CCFFCC" 
|35||W||December 26, 2003||5–0 || align="left"|  Los Angeles Kings (2003–04) ||13–9–10–3 || 
|- align="center" 
|36||T||December 27, 2003||4–4 OT|| align="left"| @ Los Angeles Kings (2003–04) ||13–9–11–3 || 
|- align="center" bgcolor="#CCFFCC" 
|37||W||December 29, 2003||5–2 || align="left"|  Nashville Predators (2003–04) ||14–9–11–3 || 
|- align="center" bgcolor="#CCFFCC" 
|38||W||December 31, 2003||1–0 || align="left"| @ Columbus Blue Jackets (2003–04) ||15–9–11–3 || 
|-

|- align="center" bgcolor="#FFBBBB"
|39||L||January 2, 2004||1–2 || align="left"| @ Chicago Blackhawks (2003–04) ||15–10–11–3 || 
|- align="center" bgcolor="#CCFFCC" 
|40||W||January 3, 2004||3–1 || align="left"| @ St. Louis Blues (2003–04) ||16–10–11–3 || 
|- align="center" bgcolor="#CCFFCC" 
|41||W||January 5, 2004||2–1 || align="left"| @ Vancouver Canucks (2003–04) ||17–10–11–3 || 
|- align="center" bgcolor="#FF6F6F"
|42||OTL||January 8, 2004||2–3 OT|| align="left"|  Columbus Blue Jackets (2003–04) ||17–10–11–4 || 
|- align="center" bgcolor="#CCFFCC" 
|43||W||January 10, 2004||5–2 || align="left"|  Atlanta Thrashers (2003–04) ||18–10–11–4 || 
|- align="center" bgcolor="#FFBBBB"
|44||L||January 13, 2004||0–3 || align="left"|  Dallas Stars (2003–04) ||18–11–11–4 || 
|- align="center" bgcolor="#CCFFCC" 
|45||W||January 15, 2004||3–1 || align="left"|  Vancouver Canucks (2003–04) ||19–11–11–4 || 
|- align="center" bgcolor="#CCFFCC" 
|46||W||January 17, 2004||2–1 || align="left"| @ Colorado Avalanche (2003–04) ||20–11–11–4 || 
|- align="center" bgcolor="#CCFFCC" 
|47||W||January 19, 2004||2–1 || align="left"|  Detroit Red Wings (2003–04) ||21–11–11–4 || 
|- align="center" bgcolor="#CCFFCC" 
|48||W||January 21, 2004||4–2 || align="left"| @ Phoenix Coyotes (2003–04) ||22–11–11–4 || 
|- align="center" bgcolor="#FFBBBB"
|49||L||January 22, 2004||1–2 || align="left"|  Phoenix Coyotes (2003–04) ||22–12–11–4 || 
|- align="center" bgcolor="#CCFFCC" 
|50||W||January 24, 2004||4–0 || align="left"|  Minnesota Wild (2003–04) ||23–12–11–4 || 
|- align="center" bgcolor="#CCFFCC" 
|51||W||January 28, 2004||4–1 || align="left"|  Calgary Flames (2003–04) ||24–12–11–4 || 
|- align="center" bgcolor="#FFBBBB"
|52||L||January 30, 2004||1–3 || align="left"| @ Dallas Stars (2003–04) ||24–13–11–4 || 
|- align="center" bgcolor="#FF6F6F"
|53||OTL||January 31, 2004||2–3 OT|| align="left"| @ Nashville Predators (2003–04) ||24–13–11–5 || 
|-

|- align="center" bgcolor="#CCFFCC" 
|54||W||February 3, 2004||3–0 || align="left"|  Florida Panthers (2003–04) ||25–13–11–5 || 
|- align="center" bgcolor="#CCFFCC" 
|55||W||February 5, 2004||5–0 || align="left"|  Phoenix Coyotes (2003–04) ||26–13–11–5 || 
|- align="center" bgcolor="#FFBBBB"
|56||L||February 10, 2004||1–2 || align="left"| @ Buffalo Sabres (2003–04) ||26–14–11–5 || 
|- align="center" bgcolor="#FFBBBB"
|57||L||February 11, 2004||2–4 || align="left"| @ Detroit Red Wings (2003–04) ||26–15–11–5 || 
|- align="center" bgcolor="#CCFFCC" 
|58||W||February 14, 2004||2–1 OT|| align="left"| @ Columbus Blue Jackets (2003–04) ||27–15–11–5 || 
|- align="center" bgcolor="#CCFFCC" 
|59||W||February 16, 2004||5–2 || align="left"| @ Philadelphia Flyers (2003–04) ||28–15–11–5 || 
|- align="center" bgcolor="#FFBBBB"
|60||L||February 18, 2004||3–7 || align="left"| @ Nashville Predators (2003–04) ||28–16–11–5 || 
|- align="center" bgcolor="#CCFFCC" 
|61||W||February 19, 2004||6–3 || align="left"| @ Chicago Blackhawks (2003–04) ||29–16–11–5 || 
|- align="center" bgcolor="#CCFFCC" 
|62||W||February 23, 2004||4–2 || align="left"|  Columbus Blue Jackets (2003–04) ||30–16–11–5 || 
|- align="center" bgcolor="#FF6F6F"
|63||OTL||February 26, 2004||2–3 OT|| align="left"| @ Vancouver Canucks (2003–04) ||30–16–11–6 || 
|- align="center" bgcolor="#CCFFCC" 
|64||W||February 27, 2004||4–2 || align="left"|  Pittsburgh Penguins (2003–04) ||31–16–11–6 || 
|- align="center" bgcolor="#CCFFCC" 
|65||W||February 29, 2004||1–0 || align="left"|  St. Louis Blues (2003–04) ||32–16–11–6 || 
|-

|- align="center" bgcolor="#CCFFCC" 
|66||W||March 3, 2004||4–3 || align="left"|  Montreal Canadiens (2003–04) ||33–16–11–6 || 
|- align="center" bgcolor="#FFBBBB"
|67||L||March 5, 2004||1–5 || align="left"| @ Colorado Avalanche (2003–04) ||33–17–11–6 || 
|- align="center" bgcolor="#FFBBBB"
|68||L||March 7, 2004||0–4 || align="left"| @ Dallas Stars (2003–04) ||33–18–11–6 || 
|- align="center" bgcolor="#FFBBBB"
|69||L||March 9, 2004||3–4 || align="left"|  Minnesota Wild (2003–04) ||33–19–11–6 || 
|- align="center" bgcolor="#CCFFCC" 
|70||W||March 11, 2004||5–4 || align="left"|  New York Islanders (2003–04) ||34–19–11–6 || 
|- align="center" bgcolor="#CCFFCC" 
|71||W||March 13, 2004||3–1 || align="left"|  Los Angeles Kings (2003–04) ||35–19–11–6 || 
|- align="center" 
|72||T||March 16, 2004||3–3 OT|| align="left"| @ Dallas Stars (2003–04) ||35–19–12–6 || 
|- align="center" bgcolor="#CCFFCC" 
|73||W||March 18, 2004||5–3 || align="left"| @ Los Angeles Kings (2003–04) ||36–19–12–6 || 
|- align="center" bgcolor="#CCFFCC" 
|74||W||March 19, 2004||4–2 || align="left"| @ Mighty Ducks of Anaheim (2003–04) ||37–19–12–6 || 
|- align="center" bgcolor="#FFBBBB"
|75||L||March 21, 2004||2–5 || align="left"|  Edmonton Oilers (2003–04) ||37–20–12–6 || 
|- align="center" bgcolor="#CCFFCC" 
|76||W||March 23, 2004||5–2 || align="left"|  Detroit Red Wings (2003–04) ||38–20–12–6 || 
|- align="center" bgcolor="#CCFFCC" 
|77||W||March 25, 2004||3–2 || align="left"|  Calgary Flames (2003–04) ||39–20–12–6 || 
|- align="center" bgcolor="#CCFFCC" 
|78||W||March 26, 2004||3–0 || align="left"| @ Phoenix Coyotes (2003–04) ||40–20–12–6 || 
|- align="center" bgcolor="#CCFFCC" 
|79||W||March 28, 2004||2–1 OT|| align="left"|  Dallas Stars (2003–04) ||41–20–12–6 || 
|- align="center" bgcolor="#CCFFCC" 
|80||W||March 31, 2004||3–0 || align="left"| @ Los Angeles Kings (2003–04) ||42–20–12–6 || 
|-

|- align="center" bgcolor="#FFBBBB"
|81||L||April 2, 2004||1–4 || align="left"|  Vancouver Canucks (2003–04) ||42–21–12–6 || 
|- align="center" bgcolor="#CCFFCC" 
|82||W||April 4, 2004||4–3 OT|| align="left"|  Los Angeles Kings (2003–04) ||43–21–12–6 || 
|-

|-
| Legend:

Playoffs

|- align="center" bgcolor="#CCFFCC"
| 1 || April 8 || St. Louis || 0–1 || San Jose || OT || Nabokov || 17,496 || Sharks lead 1–0 || 
|- align="center" bgcolor="#CCFFCC"
| 2 || April 10 || St. Louis || 1–3 || San Jose ||  || Nabokov || 17,496 || Sharks lead 2–0 || 
|- align="center" bgcolor="#FFBBBB"
| 3 || April 12 || San Jose || 1–4 || St. Louis ||  || Nabokov || 19,023 || Sharks lead 2–1 || 
|- align="center" bgcolor="#CCFFCC"
| 4 || April 13 || San Jose || 4–3 || St. Louis ||  || Nabokov || 19,452 || Sharks lead 3–1 || 
|- align="center" bgcolor="#CCFFCC"
| 5 || April 15 || St. Louis || 1–3 || San Jose ||  || Nabokov || 17,496 || Sharks win 4–1 || 
|-

|- align="center" bgcolor="#CCFFCC"
|1|| April 22 || Colorado || 2–5 || San Jose || || Nabokov || 17,496 || Sharks lead 1–0 || 
|- align="center" bgcolor="#CCFFCC"
|2|| April 24 || Colorado || 1–4 || San Jose || || Nabokov || 17,496 || Sharks lead 2–0 || 
|- align="center" bgcolor="#CCFFCC"
|3|| April 26 || San Jose || 1–0 || Colorado || || Nabokov || 18,007 || Sharks lead 3–0 || 
|- align="center" bgcolor="#FFBBBB"
|4|| April 28 || San Jose || 0–1 || Colorado || OT || Nabokov || 18,007 || Sharks lead 3–1 || 
|- align="center" bgcolor="#FFBBBB"
|5|| May 1 || Colorado || 2–1 || San Jose || OT || Nabokov || 17,496 || Sharks lead 3–2 || 
|- align="center" bgcolor="#CCFFCC"
|6|| May 4 || San Jose || 3–1 || Colorado || || Nabokov || 18,007 || Sharks win 4–2 || 
|-

|- align="center" bgcolor="#FFBBBB"
| 1 || May 9 || Calgary || 4–3 || San Jose || OT || Nabokov || 17,496 || Flames lead 1–0 || 
|- align="center" bgcolor="#FFBBBB"
| 2 || May 11 || Calgary || 4–1 || San Jose || || Nabokov || 17,496 || Flames lead 2–0 || 
|- align="center" bgcolor="#CCFFCC"
| 3 || May 13 || San Jose || 3–0 || Calgary || || Nabokov || 19,289 || Flames lead 2–1 || 
|- align="center" bgcolor="#CCFFCC"
| 4 || May 16 || San Jose || 4–2 || Calgary || || Nabokov || 19,289 || Series tied 2–2 || 
|- align="center" bgcolor="#FFBBBB"
| 5 || May 17 || Calgary || 3–0 || San Jose || || Nabokov || 17,496 || Flames lead 3–2 || 
|- align="center" bgcolor="#FFBBBB"
| 6 || May 19 || San Jose || 1–3 || Calgary || || Nabokov || 19,289 || Flames win 4–2 || 
|-

|-
| Legend:

Player statistics

Scoring
 Position abbreviations: C = Center; D = Defense; G = Goaltender; LW = Left Wing; RW = Right Wing
  = Joined team via a transaction (e.g., trade, waivers, signing) during the season. Stats reflect time with the Sharks only.
  = Left team via a transaction (e.g., trade, waivers, release) during the season. Stats reflect time with the Sharks only.

Goaltending

Awards and records

Awards

Milestones

Transactions
The Sharks were involved in the following transactions from June 10, 2003, the day after the deciding game of the 2003 Stanley Cup Finals, through June 7, 2004, the day of the deciding game of the 2004 Stanley Cup Finals.

Trades

Players acquired

Players lost

Signings

Draft picks
San Jose's draft picks at the 2003 NHL Entry Draft held at the Gaylord Entertainment Center in Nashville, Tennessee.

Notes

References

 
 

San
San
San Jose Sharks seasons
San Jose Sharks
San Jose Sharks